Maes-bangor is a hamlet in the community of Melindwr, Ceredigion, Wales, which is 72.2 miles (116.1 km) from Cardiff and 174.9 miles (281.4 km) from London. Maes-bangor is represented in the Senedd by Elin Jones (Plaid Cymru) and is part of the Ceredigion constituency in the House of Commons.

References

See also 
 Bangor - city in North Wales
 List of localities in Wales by population

Villages in Ceredigion